George Keenan was a boxer from Chicago. In 1931 he won the National Golden Gloves Welterweight Champions.

References

Boxers from Chicago
American male boxers
Year of birth missing
Year of death missing
Welterweight boxers